Harishchandrapur Assembly constituency is an assembly constituency in Malda district in the Indian state of West Bengal.

Overview
As per orders of the Delimitation Commission, No. 46 Harishchandrapur Assembly constituency covers Harishchandrapur II community development block and  Bhingole, Harishchandrapur and Mahendrapur gram panchayats of Harischandrapur I community development block.

Harishchandrapur Assembly constituency is part of No. 7 Maldaha Uttar (Lok Sabha constituency). It was earlier part of Raiganj (Lok Sabha constituency).

Members of Legislative Assembly

Election results

2021

2016

2011
In the 2011 election, Tajamul Hossain of AIFB defeated his nearest rival Mostaque Alam of Congress.

1977–2006
In the 2006 state assembly elections Tajmul Hossain of Forward Bloc won the Harishchandrapur assembly seat defeating his nearest rival Alam Mostaque of Congress. Contests in most years were multi cornered but only winners and runners are being mentioned. Alam Mostaque of Congress defeated Birendra Kumar Maitra of Forward Bloc in 2001. Birendra Kumar Maitra of Forward Bloc defeated Alam Mostaque of Congress in 1996 and Abdul Wahed of Congress in 1991 and 1987. Abdul Wahed of Congress defeated Subhash Chaudhury of Forward Bloc in 1982. Birendra Kumar Maitra of Janata Party defeated Mohammad Elias Razi of WPI in 1977.

1951–1972
Goutam Chakravarty of Congress won in 1972. Md. Elias Razi of WPI/ Independent won in 1971, 1969 and 1967. Birendra Kumar Maitra of Congress won in 1962. Md. Elias Razi contesting as an independent candidate won in 1957. In independent India's first election in 1951, Ramhari Roy of Congress won the Harishchandrapur seat.

References

Assembly constituencies of West Bengal
Politics of Malda district